Terry Joe Harper (born August 19, 1955), is a retired professional baseball player who played outfielder in the Major Leagues from -. He played for the Atlanta Braves, Pittsburgh Pirates, and Detroit Tigers, as well as one season for the Yakult Swallows in Japan. Harper now works as a hitting coach in the Atlanta area.

External links

Baseball Gauge
Japanese League
Retrosheet
Venezuelan Professional Baseball League

1955 births
Living people
African-American baseball players
American expatriate baseball players in Japan
Atlanta Braves players
Baseball players from Georgia (U.S. state)
Detroit Tigers players
Greenwood Braves players
Gulf Coast Braves players
Leones del Caracas players
American expatriate baseball players in Venezuela
Major League Baseball outfielders
People from Douglasville, Georgia
Pittsburgh Pirates players
Savannah Braves players
Sportspeople from the Atlanta metropolitan area
Richmond Braves players
Tiburones de La Guaira players
Wytheville Braves players
Yakult Swallows players
21st-century African-American people
20th-century African-American sportspeople